The 2013–14 Incarnate Word Cardinals men's basketball team represented the University of the Incarnate Word during the 2013–14 NCAA Division I men's basketball season. The Cardinals were led by eighth year head coach Ken Burmeister and played their home games at McDermott Convocation Center. They were new members of the Southland Conference.

This was year 1 of a 4-year transitional period for Incarnate Word from DII to DI. During year 1 they only played conference opponents once, with the exception of Abilene Christian, and were classified as a DII school for scheduling purposes. Since Abilene Christian was also transitioning, they played them twice. Incarnate Word could not win the regular season basketball title for the 2013–14 season.

In years 2–4 Incarnate Word will be classified as a DI school for scheduling purposes. They will increase the number of conference games, and they can win the regular season conference title. However Incarnate Word cannot participate in the conference tournament until the 2017–18 season, at which time they will also be able to enter the post-season tournaments, should they win the conference.

They finished this season 21–6, 9–5 in Southland play to finish in fifth place.

Audio streaming
All Incarnate Word games were broadcast on KKYX. KKYX's broadcasts will be available at their website. KUIW Radio also produced a student media broadcast for each non-televised home game, that will be available online, and they will provide streaming of all non-televised home games will be shown via UIW TV.

Roster

Schedule

|-
!colspan=9 style="" | Regular Season

References

Incarnate Word Cardinals men's basketball seasons
Incarnate Word
Incarnate Word Cardinals men's basketball
Incarnate Word Cardinals men's basketball